Walter Wilkinson is the name of

 Walter Butler Wilkinson (1781–1807), political figure in Upper Canada
 Walter Wilkinson (puppeteer) (1888–1970), British puppeteer
 Walter Ernest Wilkinson (1903–2001), known as "Wilkie", British mechanic and founder member of the British Racing Mechanics Club
 Walter Wilkinson (actor) (1916–1981), American actor
 Walter Wilkinson (athlete) (born 1944), British middle-distance runner